The North American Society for Philosophical Hermeneutics is an organization whose purpose is to advance the study of philosophical hermeneutics. Although the society has a particular interest in the work of Hans-Georg Gadamer, it likewise encourages dialogue and engagement with a multitude of philosophical thinkers, traditions, and contemporary concerns. It was established in 2005.

Gadamer scholars Lauren Swayne Barthold (2005-2008), Lawrence Schmidt (2010-2019),James C. Risser (2012-2015), Theodore George (2013-2016), Alejandro Vallega (2017-2019),Georgia Warnke (2015-2018), Cynthia Nielsen (2016-), Carolyn Culbertson (2017-), Greg Lynch (2020-), and David Vessey (2021-) have served on the society's executive committee.

NASPH regularly has special sessions at the Society for Phenomenology and Existential Philosophy (SPEP).

NASPH is a recognized affiliated group of the American Philosophical Association  and the Society for Phenomenology and Existential Philosophy.

See also
North American Nietzsche Society

References

External links
Official website
Official archive
NASPH Facebook Page

Philosophical societies in the United States
2005 establishments in the United States
Organizations established in 2005
American philosophy
Hermeneutics
Continental philosophy organizations